The 1978 United States Senate election in Montana took place on November 7, 1978. Following the death of United States Senator Lee Metcalf on January 12, 1978, Montana Supreme Court Chief Justice Paul G. Hatfield was appointed to serve for the remainder of Metcalf's term. Hatfield opted to run for a full term, but was overwhelmingly defeated in the Democratic primary by U.S. Representative Max Baucus of the 1st congressional district. Baucus advanced to the general election, where he was opposed by the Republican nominee, author Larry R. Williams. Baucus ended up defeating Williams by a solid margin to win his first term in the Senate, and, following Hatfield's resignation on December 12, 1978, he began serving his first term in the Senate.

Despite the death of Metcalf, this was not a special election, as one for the year 1978 was already planned as a normal Senate election.

Democratic primary

Candidates 
 Max Baucus, U.S. Representative from Montana's 1st congressional district
 Paul G. Hatfield, incumbent U.S. Senator
 John Driscoll, former Speaker of the Montana House of Representatives
 Steve Shugrue

Results

Republican primary

Candidates 
 Larry R. Williams, author
 Bill Osborne
 Clancy Rich

Results

General election

Results

See also 
 1978 United States Senate elections

References 

Montana
1978
1978 Montana elections